South Rowan High School is a public, co-educational secondary school located in China Grove, North Carolina. It is one of seven high schools in the Rowan-Salisbury School System

History
South Rowan High School opened in 1961.

In 2006, the Rowan-Salisbury Board of Education made headlines when students at South Rowan started up a gay–straight alliance. In response to public complaint, led by Flip Benham of Operation Save America from neighboring Cabarrus county, the board adopted a policy banning "Sex-based student clubs" at all schools in the system.

Graduations are generally held at South Rowan's own James Donnell Stadium, on the school's campus.

Demographics
For the 2010–11 school year, South Rowan High School had a total population of 966 students and 66.15 teachers on a (FTE) basis. The student population had a gender ratio of 51.04% male to 48.96% female. The demographic group makeup of the student population was: White, 81.88%; Hispanic, 9.01%; Black, 6.42%; American Indian, 0.62%; and Asian/Pacific Islander, 0.31% (two or more races, 1.76%). For the same school year, 43.79% of the students received free and reduced-cost lunches.

Athletics
South Rowan is a member of the 2A Central Carolina Conference.

Notable alumni
 Tommy Barnhardt, former NFL punter
 Daniel Hemric, current full-time NASCAR Xfinity Series and part-time NASCAR Cup Series driver for Kaulig Racing and 2021 NASCAR Xfinity Series champion
 Britt Nicole, vocalist, songwriter, and recording artist
 Joseph Poole, better known by his stage name Wednesday 13, singer and musician
 Brian Smith, former MLB pitcher

References

External links

Public high schools in North Carolina
Educational institutions established in 1961
Schools in Rowan County, North Carolina
1961 establishments in North Carolina